The yellow-cheeked lorikeet (Saudareos meyeri) is a species of parrot in the family Psittaculidae. It is endemic to Sulawesi in Indonesia. It is generally common.

It was formerly considered conspecific with the Sula lorikeet and collectively called the citrine lorikeet.

References

yellow-cheeked lorikeet
Endemic birds of Sulawesi
yellow-cheeked lorikeet
Taxobox binomials not recognized by IUCN